The Lichte porcelain (GmbH) was founded 1822 in Lichte, Thuringian Highlands.

History 
On the northern hillside of the Thuringian Highland, close to the Rennsteig, where the early settlements of the Thuringian porcelain manufacturing took its rise, Johann Heinrich Leder established in 1822 a new porcelain manufacturer, today’s Lichte porcelain (GmbH).

Early work 
Although the newly established porcelain manufacturer was from the very beginning in close competition to the already 1764 founded local Wallendorf porcelain manufacture,

Structure of the manufacture

See also
Lichte, the municipality
Porcelain manufactures in Europe

References
 Wilhelm Stieda: Die Anfänge der Porzellanfabrikation auf dem Thüringerwalde Jena 1902, S. 71 ff
 Commemorative publication to the 100th anniversary, Lichte, Dec. 1922, Heubach brothers AG

External links
 Website of the Thuringian porcelain road

Ceramics manufacturers of Germany
Companies based in Thuringia
Manufacturing companies established in 1822
Germany–Soviet Union relations
Lichte
German porcelain
Volkseigene Betriebe
1822 establishments in Europe